McGrath (Tochak’ in Upper Kuskokwim, Digenegh in Deg Xinag) is a city and village on the Kuskokwim River in Alaska, United States. The population was 301 at the 2020 census. Despite its small population, the village is an important transportation and economic hub for the area.

History 

The Old Town McGrath site, across the river from present-day McGrath, was a meeting and trading place for Big River, Nikolai, Telida, and Lake Minchumina villagers.

In 1904, Abraham Appel established a trading post in Old Town. Since McGrath was the northernmost point on the Kuskokwim River accessible by large riverboats, it became a regional supply center. A town was established at the site of Old McGrath in 1907, and was named for Peter McGrath, a local United States Marshal. The Iditarod Trail also contributed to McGrath's role as a supply center. From 1911 to 1920, hundreds of people walked and mushed over the trail on their way to the Ophir gold districts. Mining sharply declined after 1925.

After a major flood in 1933, some residents moved across the river. Changes in the course of the river eventually left the old site on a slough, making it useless as a river stop. In 1940, an airstrip was cleared, the United States Federal Aviation Administration built a communications complex, and a school was opened. McGrath became an important refueling stop for Lend-Lease equipment during World War II.

Geography

McGrath is located on the south bank of the Kuskokwim River in western Alaska.

Climate
McGrath has a continental subarctic climate (Köppen Dfc).

Notes

Demographics

McGrath first appeared on the 1920 U.S. Census as an unincorporated village. It formally incorporated in 1975.

As of the census of 2000, there were 401 people, 145 households, and 99 families residing in the city.  The population density was 8.2 people per square mile (3.2/km2).  There were 213 housing units at an average density of 4.4 per square mile (1.7/km2).  The racial makeup of the city was 42.64% White, 43.89% Native American, 0.75% Asian, 0.75% from other races, and 11.97% from two or more races.  Hispanic or Latino of any race were 1.00% of the population.

Of the 145 household 42.8% had children under the age of 18 living with them, 45.5% were married couples living together, 11.7% had a female householder with no husband present, and 31.7% were non-families. 26.9% of all households were made up of individuals, and 4.8% had someone living alone who was 65 years of age or older.  The average household size was 2.77 and the average family size was 3.34.

In the city, the age distribution of the population shows 35.9% under the age of 18, 8.5% from 18 to 24, 24.7% from 25 to 44, 25.9% from 45 to 64, and 5.0% who were 65 years of age or older.  The median age was 33 years. For every 100 females, there were 104.6 males.  For every 100 females age 18 and over, there were 107.3 males.

The median income for a household in the city was $43,056, and the median income for a family was $44,167. Males had a median income of $41,875 versus $41,389 for females. The per capita income for the city was $21,553.  About 8.7% of families and 9.8% of the population were below the poverty line, including 10.8% of those under age 18 and 17.4% of those age 65 or over.

Education
The Iditarod Area School District operates the McGrath School.

Media
KSKO is a non-commercial NPR affiliate at 89.5 FM. KSKO simulcasts to the villages of Grayling (KGYA), Shageluk (KNKO), Holy Cross (KLOP), Nikolai (KNIB) and Anvik (KMGS). KSKO celebrated its 40th anniversary on July 1, 2021.

See also
 McGrath Airport

References

External links
 Alaska Division of Community and Regional Affairs: McGrath
 City of McGrath official website

Cities in Alaska
Cities in Yukon–Koyukuk Census Area, Alaska